Underground Vol. 2: Club Memphis is a compilation album by Three 6 Mafia. Like its predecessor, "Underground Vol. 1: (1991-1994)", this is a collection of Three 6 Mafia's greatest underground hits.

Track listing
All tracks produced by DJ Paul and Juicy J.
 "Y'all Ready For This" - Lord Infamous
 "Half on a Sack or Blow" - Lil' E (a.k.a. Mac E)
 "Suck a Nigga Dick (Pt. II)" -  Juicy J & Gangsta Boo (Mighty Rubble and Mighty Skye on the original version)
 "Lick My Nutts" - Lord Infamous
 "Funky Town" - Ned McDodd & Uniqua
 "Fuck Dat Nigga" - DJ Paul ft. Project Pat
 "Blow A Nigga Ass Off (Pt. II) - S.O.G. (featuring Lil Glock and Owen Wilson)
 "Liquor & Dat Bud" - Three 6 Mafia
 "Fuck Dat Shit" - Juicy J
 "Beat Down" - Lord Infamous feat. Fox McCloud
 "Droppin' Dat Dirt" - Devin Steel
 "No I'm Not Dat Nigga" - Juicy J ft. Peppy
 "Nine To Yo Dome" - Project Pat (featuring Gooniqua and Goostin)
 "South Memphis Representin'" - Michael "Boogaloo" Boyd
 "Get Buck Mutha Fucka (Original)" - Juicy J
 "Long & Hard (Original)" - DJ Paul & Lord Infamous
 "Tear Da Club Up (Original)" - DJ Paul, Lord Infamous & Skeleton Daddy
 "North Memphis Area" - Mighty Marshall & Mighty Skye
 "Slob on My Cat" - Juicy J & Gangsta Boo

References

1999 compilation albums
Three 6 Mafia compilation albums
Albums produced by DJ Paul
Albums produced by Juicy J